The maqāma (literally "assembly"; plural maqāmāt) is an (originally) Arabic prosimetric literary genre which alternates the Arabic rhymed prose known as Saj‘ with intervals of poetry in which rhetorical extravagance is conspicuous.

There are only eleven illustrated versions of the Maqāmāt from the 13 and the 14th centuries that survive to this day.  Four of these currently reside in the British Library in London, while three are in Paris at the Bibliothèque nationale de France (including al-Harīrī's Maqāmāt). One copy is at the following libraries: the Bodleian Library in Oxford, the Suleymaniye Library in Istanbul, the Österreichische Nationalbibliothek in Vienna, and the Russian Academy of Sciences in Saint Petersburg.    

Those Maqāmāt manuscripts were likely created and illustrated for the specialized book markets in cities such as Baghdad, Cairo, and Damascus, rather than for any particular patron. The audience for the manuscripts were of elite and educated classes, such as nobles or scholars, as the Maqāmāt was largely appreciated and valued for its nuanced poetry and language choice, rather than its manuscript illustrations.  The al-Harīrī Maqāmāt, also called the Schefer Maqāmāt, was illustrated by al-Wasiti and contains the highest amount of illustrations as well as being the most studied by scholars.

Terminology
The origins of the usage of the word as a genre-label are debated. But according to Amina Shah,

The meaning of the word Makamat is derived from "a place where one stands upright" and hence the place where one is at any time. Next it is used metonymically to denote "the persons assembled at any place" and finally, by another translation, "the discourses delivered or conversations held in any such assembly". This metaphorical use of the word Makamat has however been restricted to discourse and conversations like those narrated by Hariri and his predecessor Al Hamadani, which are composed in a highly finished style, and solely for the purpose of exhibiting specimens of various kinds of eloquence, and exemplifying rules of grammar, rhetoric and poetry.

Structure
According to J. Hämeen-Anttila, the typical maqāmāt can be schematized 'into “isnād” [the citations or "backings" used to verify the legitimacy of a hadith], “general introduction,” “link,” “episode proper,” “recognition scene,” “envoi,” and “finale.”' Ailin Qian has exemplified this schema with reference to that Maqamat Badi' az-Zaman al-Hamadhani: 'after the initial isnād,' the narrator ʿĪsā 'tells the audience that for a certain reason “I was in such-and-such a city” or “I traveled from here
to there”; this constitutes the “general introduction.” That is followed by a transitional formula, like “one day, when I...” (fa baynamā anā yawman), “and so on till...” (wa
halumma jarran ilā an), leading to the “episode proper.” Then through the eyes of ʿĪsā we are introduced to an anonymous trickster who shows remarkable erudition and eloquence, and always succeeds “in swindling money out of the gullible narrator.”' The trickster al-Iskandarī's identity is then recognised; 'In answering ʿĪsā’s questions, al-Iskandarī then chants an envoi poem, either as an indicator of his identity or also an apologia for his misbehaviors. In many of the Hamadhānian maqāmāt, an envoi marks the end of the story, but occasionally the envoi is followed by a “finale,” where ʿĪsā and al-Iskandarī are described as departing.'

Origins
The maqama first appeared as a major literary form in the 10th century. The maqama grew out of a cluster of prose genres, collectively known as adab.

There is still much scholarly debate concerning the origins of the genre' of the maqāma. 
While the tenth-century author Badī' al-Zaman al-Hamadhāni is generally credited as the originator of the genre with his Maqamat Badi' az-Zaman al-Hamadhani, some scholars credit Ahmad Ibn al-Farsi (d. 383/1004) as the originator of the maqamat genre, even before al-Hamadhani. His work was followed by a collection of ten maqamat by Ibn Nāqiyā. However, the genre took off a century after al-Hamadhāni's work, when al-Hariri of Basra extended the genre and ensured its popularity by elevating it to a literary art form. Even during al-Hariri’s lifetime, the maqamat were worthy of memorisation, recitation and scholarly criticism.

Both authors' maqāmāt centre on trickster figures whose wanderings and exploits in speaking to assemblies of the powerful are conveyed by a narrator. The protagonist is a silver-tongued hustler, a rogue drifter who survives by dazzling onlookers with virtuoso displays of rhetorical acrobatics, including mastery of classical Arabic poetry (or of biblical Hebrew poetry and prose in the case of the Hebrew maqāmāt), and classical philosophy. Typically, there are 50 unrelated episodes in which the rogue character, often in disguise, tricks the narrator out of his money and leads him into various straitened, embarrassing, and even violent circumstances. Despite this serial abuse, the narrator-dupe character continues to seek out the trickster, fascinated by his rhetorical flow.

The earliest maqama, especially those by al-Hamadani, made use of anecdotes collected in the 9th century by earlier writers, such as al-Jahiz and al-Taniikhi, but used a narrator to introduce the anecdote. Al-Hamadani’s innovation was to apply saj’ (an ornate form of rhyming prose, interspersed with verse), to the retelling of fictional anecdotes. Until the time of al-Hamadani, saj’ had been confined to religious and political works.

The popularity of the maqama genre quickly spread across the East: versions appeared in Persian, Hebrew and Syriac. Within a few years of al-Hariri’s "Maqamat", the genre spread to al-Andalus (now Andalusia, Spain), courtesy of a small group of poets. In April, 1111, the Andalus poet and scholar, Abu al-Hajjaj Yusuf ibn Ali al-Qudai attended a recitation by al-Hariri in his Baghdad garden, and was so impressed that he encouraged a small group of Andalus intellectuals to travel to Baghdad to hear the master recite his work.

Although, these poets introduced al-Andalus to the genre, interest in the maqama was confined to a relatively small group of literary men. The genre only came to the attention of Western audiences when al-Hariri’s work  was translated into Latin in the 17th and 18th centuries, but it was not until 1982 that a complete English translation of al-Hariri’s Maqamat first appeared.

During the 11th and 12th centuries, maqamat were recited before an assembled audience, and were often improvised and embellished. As such, the work had no need for illustrations. However, from the early 13th century, illustrated editions of the manuscript began to appear. Ten different illustrated editions were known for many years, but with the discovery of a new illustrated edition in 1960, the total now stands at eleven. One of the earliest and most widely known illustrated editions is that by al-Waisiti (completed in around 1236). now in the Bibliothèque nationale de France (in Paris).

Manuscripts of al-Harīrī's Maqāmāt, anecdotes of a roguish wanderer Abu Zayd from Saruj, were frequently illustrated with miniatures. A noted illustrator was Yahya ibn Mahmud al-Wasiti. al-Harīrī far exceeded the rhetorical stylistics of the genre's innovator, al-Hamadhani, to such a degree that his maqāmāt were used as a textbook for rhetoric and lexicography (the cataloging of rare words from the Bedouin speech from the 7th and 8th centuries) and indeed as schoolbooks for until Early Modern times.

Illustrations 

No known illustrations of maqamat exist prior to the 13th century. However, illustrations were added to maqamat to add grandeur and interest to the manuscripts, even though the text was usually performed orally in large groups, rather than read in solitude.  Common images across various Maqāmāt texts include: grand banquet events involving music and drinking, large groups congregated (sometimes in mosques), and general scenes involving the trickery of Abu Zayd as well as the frustration of Al Harith.  Particularly in the Saint Petersburg Maqāmāt, these scenes were meant to be humorous to those reading the text, as they often were loosely associated with the poem the image was correlated with.  These comical images were also shown through the over-exaggerated gestures, such as rigid elbows and knees, of the human figures portrayed as shown in the Vienna Maqāmāt.

The human figures expressed in these illustrations tended to be quite large in relation to the architecture they were occupying as well as typically against a blank, white background.  Most of these images either took up an entire or half page, but were not incorporated within the text as a whole.  The use of the double-page spread began to become popular during this time and were used extensively in these manuscripts.  The color palettes were typical of this time and were the schemes often employed in Qurans.

While some of the images refer to the previous text in the manuscript, scholars cannot necessarily determine the relationship between the image and the text when they do not appear to relate to each other. Although the illustrations have a clear correlation with the text, the text does not need these images to serve its purpose.  Therefore, these images can instead serve as a distraction to the reader rather than an aid. The difference of text and images is also used to cater to the taste of different groups of people. For example, the text is read by the audience who are experts of Arabic language and literature, while the images can be helpful for those with less formal education.

Captions 

Captions were used extensively in Maqāmāt manuscripts, however it is important to note that they were either added last, or perhaps even later in the manuscripts’ existence, rather than during its completion.  While the captions that were added to these illustrations did correspond to the text, they were often simplistic or only identified the figures in the image. This characteristic was irregular as compared to other manuscripts at the time such as the Mamluk Kalila wa Dimna.  To use an example by Bernard O’Kane, there is a Maqāmāt illustration that shows a large crowd with underfed children and an elderly woman.  However, this woman is instead the trickster Abu Zayd who is using these children as a ploy for empathy from the congregation of people.  While you gain this knowledge from the text of the manuscript, the caption only reads “image of the old person and the youths,” instead of implying the larger context of the scene.

However, these captions could also have been used to clarify what the illustrator failed to render in the images, rather than just an explanation of the scene produced.  Captions also created a sense of picture framing in instances of small spaces for the text, often resulting in bent captions that created an enclosure for the picture.

Shadow Play 
The illustrated Maqāmāt manuscripts made during the 13th century connects the idea of shadow play. This is shown through the emphasis of the outline, the dramatic behavior and mobile gestures of figures, the strong contrast between figures and the background, and the tendency of the figures being present in an unregulated setting. However, the Maqāmāt illustrations do not just emphasize the shadow and are instead full of bright colors, only using shadow to detail the environment around the figures.  These similarities of the Maqāmāt illustration and shadow play may have some effect on the viewer of these illustrations. In other words, these images can help viewers understand the reason for a dramatic difference between the text and paintings by suggesting that these images were not made as an aid of the text, but rather as stand alone paintings.

Influences 

The Maqāmāt illustrations have stylistic characteristics of other religions such as Christianity and Judaism. One of the main instances of Christian inspiration originates from the use of gold circles surrounding a figure's head to denote its holiness, typically used for saints in early medieval Christian manuscripts.  However, it was not meant to signify a sacred figure, but rather it is thought to create a distinction from the blank background because of its common use for ordinary figures throughout the illustrations.  Another Christian motif employed in these manuscripts is the particular treatment of the sky which also appeared in some Byzantine manuscripts.  The Vienna Maqāmāt and several earlier Maqāmāt manuscripts also included some imagery from medieval Jewish culture, such as the inclusion of their particular type of gravestone.  At this time, typical Islamic gravestones were minimalistic without many inscriptions, while several Jewish cemeteries included a type of small stepped stone grave marker. These Jewish gravestones were the ones illustrated in these manuscripts rather than the small Islamic headstones.

However, the illustrations in Maqāmāt manuscripts also included influences from the Islamic world, notably from the city of Baghdad.  Specifically in the Istanbul Maqāmāt, several buildings do recall the architectural style and form of the city, notably shown through the Mustansiriya complex that appears to be replicated throughout the illustrations. The use of vegetal designs and specific rendering of authority figures also alludes back to the style of the Islamic world which can be seen through the Arabic translations of the Greek teachings of Dioscorides.

Development in Hebrew

The maqāma genre was also cultivated in Hebrew in Spain, beginning with Yehūda al-Ḥarīzī's translation of al-Harīrī's maqāmāt into Hebrew (c. 1218), which he titled maḥberōt 'ītī'ēl ("the maqāmāt of Ithiel"). Two years later, he composed his own maḥbārōt, titled Sēfer Taḥkemōnī ("The Book of the Tachmonite"). With this work, al-Ḥarīzī sought to raise the literary prestige of Hebrew to exceed that of Classical Arabic, just as the bulk of Iberian Jewry was finding itself living in a Spanish-speaking, Latin- or Hebrew-literate environment and Arabic was becoming less commonly studied and read.

Later Hebrew maqāmāt made more significant departures, structurally and stylistically, from the classical Arabic maqāmāt of al-Hamadhānī and al-Harīrī. Joseph ibn Zabara (end of the 12th-beginning of 13th century), a resident of Barcelona and Catalan speaker, wrote the Sēfer sha'ashū'īm ("The Book of Delights"), in which the author, the narrator, and the protagonist are all Ibn Zabara himself, and in which the episodes are arranged in linear, not cyclical fashion, in a way that anticipates the structure of Spanish picaresque novels such as the anonymous Lazarillo de Tormes (1554) and Guzmán de Alfarache (1599) by Mateo Alemán.

Notable exponents
 Abu ’l-Ḥusayn Aḥmad b. Fāris(d. 1004) -10th century poet and intellectual,  who some scholars suggest developed the maqamat genre, even before Hamadani
 Badi' al-Zaman al-Hamadani 11th century Arabo-Persian writer generally credited as the originator of the maqamat genre
 Abu Muhammad b. Malik al-Qururrubi -11th century Amerian poet
 Al-Hariri of Basra – 11th century Arab scholar, poet and writer who elevated the maqamat to a major literary art
 Ibn Sharaf al-Qairawani - 11th century Amerian poet
 Abu Myhammad b. Malik al-Qururrubi 11th century Amerian poet
 Abu al-Hajjaj Yusuf ibn Ali al-Qudai – Andalus poet and writer, who after witnessing a reading by Al-Hariri in April, 1111, took the genre back to al-Andalus (now Andalusia, Spain)
 Abu al-Tahir Muhammad ibn Yusuf al-Tamimi al Saraqusti, known simply as Al-Saraqusti, (d. 1143)– a leading intellectualfrom Cordoba, al-Andalus, who imitated al-Hariri and whose work, "Maqamat Al-luzumiyah", has been described as a “masterpiece”
 Abu Abd Allah ibn Abi al-Khisal- Al-Andalus’ - scholar who wrote in the al-Hariri tradition
 Lisan al-Din ibn al-KhatibAndalusian scholar who wrote in the al-Hariri tradition
 Al-Farthibsn Khaqan - Andalusian scholar who wrote in the al-Hariri tradition
 Qadhi Hamid al-Din Abu Bakr -12th century Persian poet and writer
 Shayk Muslih al-Din Sadi- 13th century Persian poet and writer.
 Judah al-Harizi – Medieval rabbi and poet, active in Spain, who wrote a Hebrew version of the maqama and translated al-Hariri’s Maqamat into Hebrew, entitled, Tahkemoni.
 Joseph ibn Zabara (1140-1200) – Spanish-Jewish poet and satirist who composed a Hebrew maqamat
 Judah ibn Shabbetai -late 12th century Jewish-Spanish poet who composed several Hebrew versions of maqamat

Bibliography 

al-Hamadhani, Badi` al-Zaman. Maqamat. Ed. Muhammad `Abduh. Beirut: al-Maktaba al-kathulikiyya, s.a.
---. The Maqamat of Badi' al-zaman al-hamadhani: Translated from the Arabic with an Introduction and Notes. Trans. W. J. Prendergast. London: Curzon Press, 1915.
al-Hariri, Abu Muhammad al-Qasim ibn `Ali. Maqamat al-Hariri. Ed. `Isa Saba. Beirut: Dar Sadr; Dar Beirut, 1970.
---. Sharh Maqamat al-Hariri. Beirut: Dar al-Turath, 1968.
al-Saraqusti, Abu l-Tahir Muhammad ibn Yusuf. Al-Maqamat al-Luzumiya. Trans. James T. Monroe. Leiden: Brill, 2002.
---. Al-Maqamat al-luzumiyah li-l-Saraqusti. Ed. Ibrahim Badr Ahmad Dayf. Alexandria: al-Hay'at al-Misriyat al-'Ammah li-l-Kitab, 2001.
---. al-Maqamat al-Luzumiyya. Ed. Hasan al-Waragli. Tetuan: Manšurat `Ukaz, 1995.
---. al-Maqamat al-Luzumiyya li'l-Saraqusti. Ed. Ibrahim Badr Ahmad Dayf. Alexandria: al-Hay'a al-Misriyya al-`amma li'l-Kitab, 1982.
---. Las sesiones del Zaragocí: Relatos picarescos (maqamat). Trans. Ignacio Ferrando. Saragossa: U Zaragoza P, 1999.
Arie, R. "Notes sur la maqama andalouse". Hesperis-Tamuda 9.2 (1968): 204-05.
de la Granja, F. "La maqama de la fiesta de Ibn al-Murabi al-Azdi". Etudes d'Orientalisme Dedieés a la mémoire de Lévi-Provençal. Vol. 2. Paris: Maisonneuve et Larose, 1962. 591-603.
Drory, Rina. "The maqama". The Literature of Al-Andalus. Eds. María Rosa Menocal, Michael Sells and Raymond P. Scheindlin. Cambridge: Cambridge University, 2000. 190-210.
Habermann, Abraham Meir. "Maqama". EJ.
Hämeen-Anttila, Jaakko. Maqama: A History of a Genre. Wiesbaden: Harrassovitz, 2002.
Hamilton, Michelle M. "Poetry and Desire: Sexual and Cultural Temptation in the Hebrew Maqama Tradition". Wine, Women and Song: Hebrew and Arabic Literature of Medieval Iberia. Eds. Michelle M. Hamilton, Sarah J. Portnoy and David A. Wacks. Estudios de Literature Medieval Number: 2: Juan de la Cuesta Hispanic Monographs, Newark, DE, 2004. 59-73.
Ibn Shabbetai, Judah ben Isaac. "Minhat Yehudah", "'Ezrat ha-nashim" ve-"'En mishpat". Ed. Matti Huss. Vol. 1. 2 vols. Jerusalem: Hebrew University, 1991.
Ibn Zabara, Joseph ben Meir. Libre d'ensenyaments delectables: Sèfer Xaaixuïm. Trans. *Ignasi González-Llubera. Barcelona: Editorial Alpha, 1931.
Ignasi González-Llubera. Sepher Shaashuim. Ed. Israel Davidson. New York: Jewish Theological Seminary, 1914.
Katsumata, Naoya. "The Style of the Maqama: Arabic, Persian, Hebrew, Syriac". Arabic and Middle Eastern Literatures 5.2 (2002): 117-37.
Mirsky, Aharon. "al-Harizi, Judah ben Solomon". Encyclopaedia Judaica CD-ROM Edition Version 1.0. Ed. Geoffrey Wigoder. Jerusalem: Judaica Multimedia, 1997.
Wacks, David. "Framing Iberia: Maqamat and Frametale Narratives in Medieval Spain". Leiden: Brill, 2007.
[http://hdl.handle.net/1794/8225 ---. "The Performativity of Ibn al-Muqaffas] Kalila wa-Dimna and Al-Maqamat al-Luzumiyya of al-Saraqusti". Journal of Arabic Literature 34.1-2 (2003): 178-89.
---. "Reading Jaume Roig's Spill and the Libro de buen amor in the Iberian maqâma tradition". Bulletin of Spanish Studies 83.5 (2006): 597-616.
Young, Douglas C. Rogues and Genres: Generic Transformation in the Spanish Picaresque and Arabic Maqama. Newark, DE: Juan de la Cuesta Hispanic Monographs, 2004.
Young, Douglas C. "Wine and Genre: Khamriyya in the Andalusi Maqama". Wine, Women and Song: Hebrew and Arabic Poetry of Medieval Iberia''. Eds. Michelle M. Hamilton, Sarah J. Portnoy and David A. Wacks. Newark, DE: Juan de la Cuesta Hispanic Monographs, 2004.

See also
Arabic literature
Arabic miniature 
Culture of Iraq
Islamic art
List of Iraqi artists
List of Persian-language poets and authors

Notes

 
Medieval Arabic literature
Arabic poetry forms
Arabic poetry
Poetic forms